Shyam Sunder Sharma is an Indian politician and a member of the 16th Legislative Assembly of India. He represents the Mant constituency of Uttar Pradesh and is a member of the Bahujan Samaj Party political party.

Early life and education
Shyam Sunder Sharma was born in the Mathura district. He attended Dr. Bhimrao Ambedkar University and attained a Master of Arts degree.

Political career
Shyam Sunder Sharma has been a MLA for eight straight terms. He represented the Mant constituency and is a member of the All India Trinamool Congress political party. Sharma has been a member of Akhil Bhartiya Loktantrik Congress, All India Indira Congress (Tiwari) and Indian National Congress political parties in the past.

On 4 January 2016, Sharma, his son, and seven others were charged with forgery and fraud. The group stole at least Rs26.0 million.

Posts held

See also
 Mant (Assembly constituency)
 Sixteenth Legislative Assembly of Uttar Pradesh
 Uttar Pradesh Legislative Assembly

References 

All India Indira Congress (Tiwari) politicians
Akhil Bharatiya Loktantrik Congress politicians
Indian National Congress politicians
Trinamool Congress politicians from Uttar Pradesh
Dr. Bhimrao Ambedkar University alumni
Uttar Pradesh MLAs 1989–1991
Uttar Pradesh MLAs 1991–1993
Uttar Pradesh MLAs 1993–1996
Uttar Pradesh MLAs 1997–2002
Uttar Pradesh MLAs 2002–2007
Uttar Pradesh MLAs 2012–2017
Uttar Pradesh MLAs 2017–2022
People from Mathura district
1952 births
Living people
Bahujan Samaj Party politicians
Apna Dal politicians